Franz-Joseph Schulze (18 September 1918 – 31 January 2005) was a German general who was the Commander in Chief, Allied Forces Central Europe (NATO). During World War II, he served in the Luftwaffe and was a recipient of the Knight's Cross of the Iron Cross of Nazi Germany.

Awards 

 Knight's Cross of the Iron Cross on 30 November 1944 as Oberleutnant and Chef of the 3./Flak-Sturm-Regiment 241
 Großes Verdienstkreuz mit Stern und Schulterband des Verdienstordens der Bundesrepublik Deutschland
 Commander of the Legion of Honour
 Commander of the Legion of Merit

References

 

1918 births
2005 deaths
People from Salzkotten
Bundeswehr generals
Recipients of the Gold German Cross
Recipients of the Knight's Cross of the Iron Cross
Grand Crosses with Star and Sash of the Order of Merit of the Federal Republic of Germany
Commandeurs of the Légion d'honneur
Commanders of the Legion of Merit
German prisoners of war in World War II held by the United Kingdom
People from the Province of Westphalia
Generals of the German Army
Military personnel from North Rhine-Westphalia